Theobald VI of Blois (French: Thibaut) (died 1218) was count of Blois and Clermont-en-Beauvaisis from 1205 to 1218.

He was son of Louis I of Blois and Catherine of Clermont.

Theobald married twice: with Maud of Alençon and with Clemence of Roches, but remained childless.  Clemence married Geoffrey VI, Viscount of Châteaudun, as her second husband.

Theobald fought the Moors in Castile. During the campaign he contracted leprosy and returned home. After living withdrawn in his castle in La Ferté-Villeneuil for a few years, Theobald died in 1218, leaving his possessions to his aunts Margaret and Isabelle. The northern part of Blois was erected into the County of Chartres for Isabelle; Margaret received the remainder of the County of Blois, and his heirs sold Clermont to Philip II of France.

References

Sources

1218 deaths
Counts of Blois
Counts of Clermont-en-Beauvaisis
Year of birth unknown